Methylobacillus pratensis is a Gram-negative methylotrophic bacteria with was isolated from a meadow grass sampled from the city park in Helsinki. The phylogenetic and genotypic analysis shows that Methylobacillus pratensis is a novel species of the genus Methylobacillus.

References

External links
Type strain of Methylobacillus pratensis at BacDive -  the Bacterial Diversity Metadatabase

Methylophilaceae